Convoys SL 138/MKS 28 were two Allied convoys which ran during the Battle of the Atlantic in World War II. 
SL 138 was one of the SL convoys from the South Atlantic to Britain, and MKS 28 one of the MKS convoys between Britain and the Mediterranean.
They were sailing together on the Gibraltar homeward route, having made a rendezvous off Gibraltar in order to cross the Bay of Biscay with the maximum possible escort.
They were the subject of a major U-boat attack in October 1943, the first battle in the Kriegsmarines renewed Autumn offensive.

Background
Following the defeats of May 1943, and the devastating losses incurred by the U-boat Arm (U-Bootwaffe) (UBW) Adm Dönitz had withdrawn from attacks on the North Atlantic route while awaiting tactical and technical improvements.
By September 1943 these were ready, and U-boat Control (Befehlshaber der Unterseeboote)(BdU) had re-opened the offensive in the North Atlantic.
After several disastrous convoy battles, which had cost the U-boat Arm 32 U-boats destroyed for little gain (three escorts and two merchant ships sunk, and several others damaged) BdU had again withdrawn from the North Atlantic battleground.
As had happened after Black May he again switched the focus of the campaign to the Mid-Atlantic and South Atlantic routes, reasoning these would be softer targets.
To this end he established the "wolfpack" Schill off the coast of Portugal, to intercept convoys sailing to and from Gibraltar, Mediterranean and South Atlantic.

For the Allies, the success of Operation Torch and the re-opening of the Mediterranean to Allied traffic had led to the Allied convoy system in this area being re-organized. 
The previous OG/HG series to Gibraltar had been discontinued, to be replaced by the MKS/KMS series of ships to and from the Mediterranean. The OS/SL series to Freetown and the South Atlantic continued, but now the two routes were combined from Gibraltar; SL convoys from Freetown now making a rendezvous with MKS convoys from North African ports for the final leg of the journey to Britain. Similarly the OS and KMS convoys travelled together across the Bay of Biscay, before parting off Gibraltar.

Protagonists
SL 138 left Freetown on 13 October 1943, arriving off Gibraltar on 24 October. It comprised 44 ships and was escorted by 39 Escort Group, of seven warships led by the frigate Tavy (Lt.Cdr. F Ardern).  
MKS 28 sailed from Alexandria on 14 October; and after losing SS Tivives torpedoed by German aircraft off Cape Ténès on 21 October, arrived off Gibraltar on 24 October to meet SL 138. 
The combined body of 60 ships escorted  by a combined force of 12 warships then sailed for Britain.

The Schill patrol group initially comprised eight U-boats, but one of these, U-441 was attacked by Allied aircraft and forced to return.
The seven boats that remained on station deployed in a patrol line west of Portugal, while aircraft of the Luftwaffe from searched the ocean for any sign of the approaching convoys.

On 27 October 1943 a German reconnaissance aircraft sighted SL 138 and MKS 28 and reported their position.

Action
SL 138/MKS 28 was sighted three days out from the Strait of Gibraltar by a German BV 222 reconnaissance aircraft, on 27 October 1943, in the ocean to the west of Lisbon, and following this the Schill boats began to gather for an attack.

On 29 October Francke in U-262 made contact and began to shadow the convoy;  by evening he had been joined by two others, U-333 and U-306 and they commenced the attack. One ship was hit, the Norwegian freighter Hallfried, but all other attacks were driven off.

On 30 October the escort was joined by the destroyers Whitehall  and Wrestler, which had been sent as reinforcement; during that day and the following night the Schill boats had no success.

On 31 October, as the convoy came within range of air cover from Britain, Whitehall and Geranium were able to catch U-306, which was destroyed by depth charges.
With no further success after two days and nights of trying, and now with the loss of one of the Schill boats, the attack was called off and the wolf pack withdrew.

SL 138 and MKS 28 continued with no further incident and arrived at Liverpool on 5 November 1943.

Aftermath
With just one ship sunk, for the loss of one U-boat and another damaged, the attack on SL 138/MKS 28 was hardly an auspicious start to BdU's renewed offensive. The Royal Navy, meanwhile, could take heart that the success they had achieved in the North Atlantic, with convoy after convoy making its "safe and timely arrival" could also be achieved on the Biscay route.

Notes

References
 Clay Blair : Hitler's U-Boat War [Volume 2]: The Hunted 1942–1945 (1998)  (2000 UK paperback ed.)
 Arnold Hague : The Allied Convoy System 1939–1945 (2000)  (Canada)  (UK)
 Paul Kemp  : U-Boats Destroyed  (1997) . 
 Stephen Roskill : The War at Sea 1939–1945   Vol III (1960) . ISBN (none)

External links
 SL 138 at uboatnet
 SL 138/MKS 28 at convoyweb

SL138
C